Shamim Rajani (born in the 1970s) is an entrepreneur and businesswoman from Karachi, Pakistan. In 2004, she began to work professionally in the Information Technology (IT) industry of Pakistan. In 2005, she co-founded Genetech Solutions, a software development company, based in Karachi, Pakistan. Since 2010, she has been serving as the chief operating officer (COO) in the same company. In the year 2017, she launched the computer training program under the ConsulNet Corporation to educate non-tech women in Karachi. In 2018, she launched another training program, CodeGirls, in partnership with Faiza Yousuf. The CodeGirls is the subsidiary of ConsulNet Corporation. In the same year, she also began to serve as an advisor for WomenInTechPK and became the Pakistani ambassador at CryptoChicks, a research institute based in Toronto, Canada. In 2019, she became the board member of the Pakistan Agile Development Society. In the second quarter of the year 2020, she was elected as the vice-chairperson of P@SHA. She began to serve in the office from the mid of October 2020 while working closely with Jehan Ara, the president of P@SHA.

Early life 
She was born in the 1970s into a Muslim family located in Karachi, Pakistan. She was raised in a Pakistani culture family. Her family moved to Bahrain due to her father's job. In the early 1990s, she moved back to Karachi with her whole family and got married at the age of 17 years. After a few years of her marriage and a four-year child, she pursued her education in the computing field.

Education 
She received her early education in Bahrain in the 1980s. In 1997, she continued her education at a computing college located in Karachi. Later, she graduated from the Institute of Business Administration (IBA) in the Entrepreneur program in the year 2017. Further, she graduated in the Blockchain executive program from Draper University in San Francisco, California. She is also certified as a Scrum Master.

Career 
In 1998, she opened a computer training institute, ConsulNet Corporation, with the help of her father's retirement money. She worked in the institute as a computer instructor to teach non-tech young girls and women about computing languages based on bootstrap. In 2004, she received her first international website development project. In 2005, she founded Genetech Solutions and worked there as a team lead. By 2010, she began to serve Genetech Solutions as the Chief Operating Officer (COO). During 2010s, she worked for gender disparity and the empowerment of women in the Information Technology (IT) sector of Pakistan through funded programs CodeGirls on small scale. In 2017, she initiated multiple training programs through CodeGirls with Faiza Yousuf while re-establishing ConsulNet Corporation on a much larger scale by getting fund from international investors. In 2018, she became an advisory member of WomenInTechPK and used this platform to encourage women's progress in the technology industry of Pakistan. In the same year, she became the ambassador for Pakistan in the CryptoChicks, a research institute based in Toronto, Canada. This institute organizes multiple Conferences and Hackathon for Blockchain and AI technology in Pakistan from Canada. In 2019, the company won the runner-up award for best gender diversity. She began working at P@SHA as the vice-chairperson in the mid of October 2020. She is also a certified professional Scrum Master.

Contribution and recognition 

 In 1998, she established a computer training institute, ConsulNet Corporation. This institute offers free computing courses for non-tech women from lower to middle-class families. Its aim is to improve the financial inclusion of women in the Information Technology (IT) sector of Pakistan .
 In 2017, she co-founded the CodeGirls under ConsulNet Corporation with sponsorship from international investors for training Pakistani women in the IT industry across Karachi, Pakistan . 
In 2018, she conducted multiple programs to progress the technology sector of Pakistan. As one of the key board member of P@SHA, she facilitated the Oslo Innovation Week and the Canada Pakistan ICT Forum.
 In 2018, she became the advisory member for WomenInTechPK and conducted multiple workshops to empower Pakistani women in the IT industry .
In 2018, she represented the Pakistani community in CryptoChicks, located in Toronto, Canada.  
In 2019, she partnered with WomenInTechPK and CryptoChicks for conducting Blockchain & AI Hackathon in Pakistan.
In 2019, Genetech Solutions won the best Gender diversity Award during the tenure of her leadership as the COO of the company at the P@SHA ICT Awards 2019.
In 2020, she began to work as the vice-chairperson of P@SHA and organized multiple events to empower the IT industry of Pakistan.

References

See also 

 P@SHA
 Jehan Ara

Living people
Pakistani women in business
Pakistani women computer scientists
Information technology in Pakistan
Year of birth missing (living people)
Pakistani businesspeople